The Old Shit is the tenth compilation album by American hip hop group Insane Clown Posse. Released in 2010, the compilation was assembled by the group and solely focuses on the group's 1990s material, drawing from the first five Joker's Cards: Carnival of Carnage, Ringmaster, Riddle Box, The Great Milenko and The Amazing Jeckel Brothers, as well as songs from their extended plays and rare material. Like Mutilation Mix before it, almost none of the songs appear in their original full lengths meaning that many songs on this collection are shortened and often cut off early. It is the group's 27th overall release.

Track listing

References

Insane Clown Posse compilation albums
2010 compilation albums
Psychopathic Records compilation albums
Horrorcore compilation albums